Koa may be,

Koya language, India
Guwa language, Australia